William of Baskerville is a fictional Franciscan friar from the 1980 historical mystery novel The Name of the Rose (Il nome della rosa) by Umberto Eco.

Life and death 
The Name of the Rose is itself a recounting of events as experienced by Adso of Melk, a Benedictine novice (a Franciscan one in the 1986 film adaptation) who travelled under William's protection.

Years before the main events of the novel, as an inquisitor, Brother William presided at some trials in England and Italy, where he distinguished himself by his perspicacity along with great humility. In numerous cases Willam decided the accused was innocent. In one of his most consequential cases, William refused to condemn a man on charges of heresy, despite the demands of the inquisitor Bernardo Gui. The accusations of heresy stemmed from the man's translation of a Greek book that contradicted the scriptures. Despite his appeals to the Pope, William was imprisoned and tortured until he recanted, in turn leading to the translator's death by burning at the stake. Though he departed from his role as an inquisitor, his torture and the death of the accused remain fresh in his mind.

In 1327, William and Adso travel to a Benedictine monastery in Northern Italy to attend a theological disputation between the Franciscans and Papal emissaries on the poverty of Christ. This abbey is being used as an embassy between Pope John XXII, and the Friars Minor, who are suspected of heresy.

The abbey boasts a famed scriptorium where scribes copy, translate or illuminate books. After a string of unexpected deaths the abbot seeks help from William, who is renowned for his deductive powers, to investigate the deaths. William is reluctantly drawn in by the intellectual challenge and his desire to disprove fears of a demonic culprit. William also worries the abbot will summon officials of the Inquisition should the mystery remain unsolved.

Following the events of The Name of the Rose, Adso and William part ways, with Adso relating the tale before his death. We are informed near the end of the book that William had died earlier during a Plague in Europe.

Name and allusion 

The fictional friar, William of Baskerville, alludes both to the fictional sleuth Sherlock Holmes and to William of Ockham. The name itself is derived from William of Ockham and Sir Arthur Conan Doyle's book The Hound of the Baskervilles. Another view is that Eco has created Brother William as  a combination of Roger Bacon, William of Ockham and Sherlock Holmes. (William himself notes that Bacon was a mentor of his and cites his ideas several times in the course of the book.)

William of Ockham, who lived during the time of the novel, first put forward the principle known as "Ockham's Razor", which is often summarised as the dictum that one should always accept as most likely the simplest explanation that accounts for all the facts. William applies this dictum in a manner analogous to the way Sherlock Holmes applies his similar dictum, that when one has eliminated the impossible, whatever remains — however improbable — must be the truth.

Characteristics 
In the book, The Name of the Rose, Umberto Eco's description of Brother William of Baskerville has some similarities to Arthur Conan Doyle's description of Sherlock Holmes in A Study in Scarlet (1887).

Appearance 

However, William has blond eyebrows and yellowish hair clumps growing from his ears.

Behavior 
William of Baskerville's behavioral characteristics, as relayed through William's novice, Adso of Melk, also displays similarities to Sherlock Holmes' as characterized by Dr. Watson.

Sherlock Holmes' use of cocaine is also similar to Brother William's use of a mysterious herb. The book explains that Brother William used to collect some herb that has a mentally stimulating effect, but it does not seem narcotic. "He sometimes stopped at the edge of a meadow, at the entrance to a forest, to gather some herb [...] and he would then chew it with an absorbed look. He kept some of it with him, and ate it in the moments of great tension".

Portrayals in adaptations 
Sean Connery portrayed William of Baskerville in the 1986 film adaptation The Name of the Rose. John Turturro portrayed William of Baskerville in the 2019 miniseries The Name of the Rose.

Quotes
 "Books are not made to be believed, but to be subjected to inquiry." (Used as an epigram by Richard Janko in his reconstruction of Aristotle's Poetics II, Aristotle on Comedy.)
 "...learning does not consist only of knowing what we must or can do, but also of knowing what we could do and perhaps should not do."
 "...sometimes it is right to doubt."
 "Have you found any places where God would have felt at home?" (Answering to Adso's comment "Then we are living in a place abandoned by God.")
"Elementary" (To the question if one of his theories could be really true by Adso.)

References

Characters in Italian novels
Fictional English people
Fictional medieval people
Fictional historical detectives
Fictional amateur detectives
Literary characters introduced in 1980
Fictional Christian monks